The Open Smart Card Development Platform (OpenSCDP) provides a collection of tools that support users in the development, test and deployment of smart card applications. The platform supports GlobalPlatform Scripting, Profile and Messaging technology.

The complete toolset is written in Java and uses ECMAScript as a scripting language. Access to smart cards is provided through an enhanced version of the OpenCard Framework. Drivers are included for most ISO/IEC 7816-4 compliant smart cards, PC/SC and CT-API card readers. The platform also provides cryptographic support through the Java Cryptography Extension (JCE) with the Bouncy Castle Crypto API.

The toolsets and libraries of OpenSCDP are provided as Open Source under the GNU General Public License (GPL).

Architecture 

OpenSCDP utilizes a set of Open Source tools including:

 Eclipse
 OpenCard Framework
 Rhino JavaScript-Engine
 BouncyCastle Crypto Library

External links 
 Open Smart Card Development Platform

Free software programmed in Java (programming language)
Smart cards